The Ob class, Soviet designation Project 320, was a class of Soviet Navy hospital ships active in the 1980s.

After the dissolution of the Soviet Union in 1991, the ships became the property of the Russian government, but no sources indicate how the Russian Navy made use of the ships.

Development 
The four ships of the Ob-class hospital ships were designed to provide medical and recreational facilities. They were also employed as personnel transports. They have civilian crews but carry uniformed naval medical personnel. The ships are fully equipped with surgical equipment. Later two units are Project 320 II, implying a modification to the basic design; the external differences are minor.

Hospital ship Ob was decommissioned in 1997 and may have been sold to the People's Liberation Army Navy, as it was mentioned, a retired Russian hospital ship was purchased in 2007 with plans to restore it for PLAN service as hospital ship.

Project 320 

 Ob (1980-1997)
 Yenisey (1981)

Project 320 II 

 Svir (1989)
 Irtysh (1990)

Characteristics 
The size of the crew when deployed was nominally 124 sailors and 83 members of the medical staff. The on-board hospital has 300 beds, or in the event of an emergency (e.g. evacuation) for a short time up to 650 passengers. There are more than ten therapeutic and diagnostic departments, three operating rooms and one pharmacy. The ship does not carry armaments. At the stern is a landing area and hangar for one search and rescue helicopter type Kamov Ka-25PS or Ka-27PS. The propulsion system consists of two Zgoda-Sulzer 12ZV40 / 48 diesels, each with an output of 7800 hp, driving two propellers. The top speed reaches 19 knots. The range is 10,000 nautical miles at a speed of 16 knots.

Ship of class

Gallery

See also 
 List of ships of the Soviet Navy
 List of ships of Russia by project number

References 

 
Hospital ships